Hadziidae is a family of amphipods, which is difficult to distinguish from the related family Melitidae. It contains the following genera:

Allotexiweckelia
Alloweckelia
Dulzura
Hadzia
Holsingerius
Indoweckelia
Liagoceradocus
Mayaweckelia
Metahadzia
Metaniphargus
Mexiweckelia
Paramexiweckelia
Paraweckelia
Protohadzia
Psammoniphargus
Saliweckelia
Tagua
Texiweckelia
Texiweckeliopsis
Weckelia
Zhadia

References

Gammaridea
Crustacean families